"No More Tears" is a ballad song by American R&B/soul singer Angel Winbush, released as the second single from Winbush's second album, The Real Thing. "No More Tears" reached the Top ten of the airplay chart, and reached number twelve on the Billboard U.S. R&B Singles chart.

Charts

References

Angela Winbush songs
1990 singles
Songs written by Angela Winbush
1989 songs
PolyGram singles
Soul ballads
1980s ballads